On 29 November 2021, Keir Starmer, Leader of the Opposition in the United Kingdom, carried out a reshuffle of his shadow cabinet. The slimmed down shadow cabinet, was seen to be Starmer creating a top team in his own image.

The major outcome of the reshuffle was the reinstatement of Yvette Cooper to the frontbench. She returned as Shadow Home Secretary, a role she held in Ed Miliband's Shadow Cabinet.

With the departure of Cat Smith, the Shadow Cabinet now contains zero members of the Socialist Campaign Group, a left-wing faction loyal to former leader Jeremy Corbyn.

Cabinet-level changes

Junior-level changes 
On 4 December 2021, LabourList reported the junior changes to the frontbench.

 Justin Madders becomes Shadow Minister for Employment Rights and Protections
 Stephen Morgan becomes Shadow Schools Minister
 Stephen Kinnock becomes Shadow Armed Forces Minister
 Alex Norris becomes Shadow Minister for Levelling Up
 Andrew Gwynne becomes Shadow Public Health Minister
 Ellie Reeves becomes Shadow Justice Minister
 Afzal Khan becomes Shadow Justice Minister
 Karin Smyth becomes Shadow Minister for Social Care (covering for Liz Kendall who is starting maternity leave)
 Matthew Pennycook becomes Shadow Housing Minister
 Chris Elmore becomes Shadow Culture Minister
 Jeff Smith becomes Shadow Sport, Tourism, Heritage & Music Minister
 Holly Lynch becomes Shadow Security Minister
 Tulip Siddiq becomes Shadow City Minister
 Helen Hayes becomes Shadow Minister for Children and Early Years
 Feryal Clark becomes Shadow Health Minister
 Rachel Hopkins becomes Shadow Cabinet Office Minister
 Bill Esterson becomes Shadow Business & Industrial Strategy Minister
 Florence Eshalomi becomes Private Parliamentary Secretary to the Cabinet Office
 Tonia Antoniazzi becomes Shadow Northern Ireland Minister
 Alex Davies-Jones becomes Shadow Minister for Tech, Gambling & Digital Economy
 Jack Dromey becomes Shadow Home Office Minister
 Naz Shah becomes Shadow Home Office Minister
 Liz Twist becomes Shadow Scotland Minister
 Gillian Merron becomes Shadow Culture Minister
 Bambos Charalambous becomes Shadow Minister of State for the Middle East and North Africa, replacing Wayne David
 Olivia Blake becomes Shadow Climate Change & Net Zero Minister
 Lyn Brown becomes Shadow Foreign Office Minister
 Alex Sobel becomes Shadow Natural Environment & Climate Change Minister
 Ruth Cadbury becomes Shadow Trade Minister
 Andy Slaughter becomes Shadow Solicitor General
 Jessica Morden becomes Shadow Deputy Leader of the House of Commons

Reaction

Resignation of Cat Smith 
Before the reshuffle was underway, Cat Smith resigned as Shadow Secretary of State for Young People and Democracy, despite Starmer asking her to stay in her position. In her resignation letter, Smith described the ongoing suspension of Jeremy Corbyn as "utterly unsustainable" and voiced her concern that the situation was damaging the party.

Failure to inform Angela Rayner 
Deputy Leader of the Labour Party Angela Rayner was not notified of the reshuffle, as it was first reported while she was making a keynote speech on Parliamentary Standards at the Institute for Government. The resignation tweet from Cat Smith was sent out during the Q&A section, so Rayner was caught off guard. Starmer was criticised for not notifying his deputy before announcing the reshuffle. Lisa Nandy dismissed claims that Rayner had been humiliated over the alleged snub, stating that the reshuffle showed "we’re moving north" to a question on Sky News asking about the left–right focus on the reshuffle which had been discussed in the media. A similar rift occurred at the reshuffle in May 2021, in which Rayner was demoted from her position as party chair and national campaign coordinator after Labour's heavy loss in the 2021 Hartlepool by-election.

Appointment of Yvette Cooper 

Yvette Cooper's appointment as Shadow Home Secretary was one of the most significant changes announced by Starmer, as it returned her to the role she had previously occupied in 2015 as a member of the Miliband shadow cabinet. The move was seen as a shift towards the right and a further departure from the Corbyn era. Jon Craig of Sky News described Cooper as "Labour's lost leader" and speculated that her comeback would increase her odds of one day succeeding Starmer.

Other appointments 
David Lammy was promoted to Shadow Foreign Secretary. He had served as a minister under Tony Blair and Gordon Brown, and in the weeks before the reshuffle had been under scrutiny for his second job. His appointment was criticised in the Daily Telegraph.

The decision to move Lisa Nandy from her position as Shadow Foreign Secretary would have typically been regarded as a demotion; however, it was widely reported to be positive, as her new role would involve opposing the Johnson government's flagship levelling up policy and facing Michael Gove across the dispatch box. Nandy's experience as a Northern MP and interest in the importance of towns have been cited as making her well-suited to the portfolio.

Former Leader of the Labour Party Ed Miliband was moved to a new role, from Shadow Business, Energy and Industrial Strategy to Shadow Climate Change Secretary. While he had been praised for his speeches during the 2021 United Nations Climate Change Conference in Glasgow, his responsibilities may have been reduced in response to his outspoken support for the public ownership of energy companies.

Laura Kuenssberg of BBC News wrote that the slimmed down shadow cabinet aimed to "combine experience and youth". Robert Peston of ITV News described the reshuffle as abandoning "the fatuous project of trying to ... placate Labour's warring factions". Instead, Starmer has "chosen shadow ministers for their perceived ability". Stephen Bush of the New Statesman presented a more critical perspective on the reshuffle, arguing that certain appointments (such as moving to Streeting to Health rather than Education) did not appear to "make sense". Former Shadow Chancellor John McDonnell, who had served under Jeremy Corbyn, stated that the reshuffle "[gave] the impression of Christmas Past not Christmas Future", while criticising the perceived promotion of "Blairite" MPs.

The reshuffle was considered to boost Labour's chances in the Old Bexley and Sidcup by-election four days later.

See also 
 Shadow Cabinet of Keir Starmer
 Official Opposition frontbench

References 

Cabinet reshuffles in the United Kingdom
November 2021 events in the United Kingdom
2021 in British politics
Labour Party (UK)